The Worcester Foothills Theatre was a professional theater company and venue in Worcester, Massachusetts that performed a variety of plays, Musicals, and Musical Reviews.

History
The Worcester Foothills Theatre, was founded in 1974 by Marc and Susan Smith. Foothills Theatre originally operated from a 200-seat theatre in downtown Worcester. When this building was sold in 1982, Foothills spent 5 years putting up productions in various spaces. In 1987, Foothills Theatre moved to its ultimate site in the former Worcester Center Galleria.

Foothills Theatre "suspended operations" on May 10, 2009, due to lack of funding.

References

Buildings and structures in Worcester, Massachusetts
Theatres in Massachusetts
Former theatres in the United States